Griffin Campbell may refer to:

 Griffin Campbell, the protagonist of the Disney Channel TV series Secrets of Sulphur Springs
 Griffin Campbell, a construction contractor charged with involuntary manslaughter for his role in the 2013 Philadelphia building collapse